Björn Olof Johansson (born 10 September 1963) is a Swedish former cyclist. He won the bronze medal in the team time trial road race along with Jan Karlsson, Michel Lafis and Anders Jarl in the 1988 Summer Olympics. He also rode at the 1992 Summer Olympics.

References

1963 births
Living people
Swedish male cyclists
Cyclists at the 1988 Summer Olympics
Cyclists at the 1992 Summer Olympics
Olympic cyclists of Sweden
Olympic bronze medalists for Sweden
People from Vänersborg Municipality
Medalists at the 1988 Summer Olympics
Olympic medalists in cycling
Sportspeople from Västra Götaland County
20th-century Swedish people
21st-century Swedish people